The Federation of Quebec Maple Syrup Producers is a government-sanctioned private organization that regulates the production and marketing of maple syrup in Quebec. As of 2011, the FPAQ produced 94% of Canadian maple syrup and 77% of the world's supply.

The FPAQ plays a role in the collective marketing of maple products and in organizing sales inside and outside the province. Some consider it to be a cartel.

History
Beginning in 1958, the maple syrup producers of Beauce region in the south of Quebec participated in a joint plan to protect their rights as producers and to collectively market maple syrup. This effort inspired the formation of a larger agreement all across Quebec in 1966.

Since 1989, all FPAQ’s producers abide by a collective agreement to market their product. Together, the producers establish policies, negotiate their selling strategy, enforce production quota, set up quality criteria and sponsor promotional activities.  However, if they cannot come to an agreement the act calls for an outside opinion to arbitrate.  The maple syrup producers who sell directly to consumers are exempted from this law. The FPAQ collaborates with the ACER centre to conduct research and experiments on maple syrup.

In 2000, the Federation became the exclusive sales agent for bulk sales and in 2004, they reformed the quota system. In 2017, the federation had to add  five million taps due to the rise of foreign competition.

Promotion and marketing

The FPAQ is involved in many promotional activities that aim to spread the maple syrup market around the world. The FPAQ hosts culinary competitions within Quebec but also in Japan and the United States.  The FPAQ has held showcases in Hiroshima and free maple syrup tastings as promotional activities. Chefs and professionals from Hiroshima participated in a culinary competition that included an original recipe using maple syrup in 2010. The FPAQ aims to spread consumer awareness of their product in Japan in order to increase their consumption and Quebec’s exportation. The FPAQ has engaged in an agreement with Tokyo DisneySea, a Disney theme park, to promote maple syrup and encourage the Japanese to purchase  and consume it. Market strategies in Quebec are common as well; however they aim to further educate and to keep the maple syrup legacy alive in the future generations. Culinary competitions involving traditional family recipes aspire to do so. Teachers are encouraged to educate their students on maple trees and the production of maple syrup with the help of a newly published maple syrup encyclopedia.

Strategic reserve
The FPAQ maintains a strategic reserve of maple syrup, officially known as the International Strategic Reserve (ISR) and also referred to as the Global Strategic Maple Syrup Reserve. The reserve is operated as a government-sanctioned cartel to control global maple syrup prices and supply, and has been called "the OPEC of the maple syrup world" by The Economist. A barrel is worth about $1,200 or $2.88 per pound which is 10-18 times the value of U.S. crude oil.

The reserve is located in warehouses in a number of rural Quebec towns. The first two facilities were in Saint-Antoine-de-Tilly (which holds ), and Plessisville (which holds ).

History 
The strategic reserve was created in 2000.

In 2008, following multiple years of poor production, the reserves were depleted, causing a price hike and the loss of markets for pure maple syrup.

In 2011, a year which saw huge excesses of maple syrup production, FPAQ expanded the ISR to a third warehouse in Saint-Louis-de-Blandford, which holds  of syrup.

This event is known informally as the Great Canadian Maple Syrup Heist. The amount stolen was about a quarter of the facility's reserve. Slightly over a month later, police seized maple syrup stocks from a Kedgwick, New Brunswick, exporter on suspicion that it had been purchased from a Quebec supplier connected to the ISR theft. Over the next three months, police had further success in locating portions of the stolen syrup, but were still unsure of the final disposition of about one third of it. Much of it had apparently been sold to buyers who were unaware of its origins and who were led to believe it had been produced in neighbouring New Brunswick. On 18 December, police arrested three men known to have access to the warehouse from which the syrup was stolen. Fifteen more people were arrested on 20 December, with police still looking for another seven. The theft and its backstory are featured in the Netflix documentary series Dirty Money, Season 1, Episode 5.

On 28 April 2017, accused ringleader Richard Vallières, convicted in November 2016, was sentenced to eight years in prison and a $9.4 million fine. He can choose another six years of prison over paying the fine, and appealed the conviction. A few days earlier, his accomplice, Avik Caron, was sentenced to 5 years in prison and a $1.2-million fine. The Supreme Court of Canada rejected Vallières's appeal in March 2022.

On 25 January 2018, maple syrup producers Nathalie Bombardier and Daniel Gaudreau had their supply seized by the Sûreté du Québec, due to their refusal to sell their surplus production through the Federation. Instead Bombardier and Gaudreau prefer to sell their supply directly to businesses.

In 2021, the QMSP announced it would release  of maple syrup from the reserves to meet global demand. The maple syrup industry experienced record years in 2019, 2020 and 2021. Experts believe an increase in home cooking due to the COVID-19 pandemic accelerated the increased demand for maple syrup production.

References

External links

 ACER Centre

Food made from maple
Agricultural organizations based in Canada
Economy of Quebec
Agricultural marketing organizations
1966 establishments in Quebec
Organizations established in 1966
Cartels